Jang Hang-jun (born September 17, 1969) is a South Korean film and television director and screenwriter. Jang directed films, including Break Out (2002) and Spring Breeze (2003). In 2011, he turned to the small screen, co-wrote and directed Sign, a medical crime investigation drama starring Park Shin-yang and Kim Ah-joong.

Philanthropy 
On March 4, 2022, Jang donated 30 million won to the Children's Fund in Ukraine, along with his wife Kim Eun-hee,  to help Ukrainian victims in Russian invasion.

Filmography

Film

As director 
Break Out (2002)
Spring Breeze (2003)
Spectacle of Life (2007)
Manner of Battle (2008)
Humans Don't Die in the Night (2010)
Forgotten (2017)
 Open the Door (2022) ; - director; Premiere at 27th BIFF
 Rebound (2023)

As screenwriter 
The Adventure of Mrs. Park (1996)
The Chinese Restaurant Peking (1999)
Spring Breeze (2003)
Humans Don't Die in the Night (2010)
Forgotten (2017)
The Night of the Undead (2020)

As script editor 
Ghost House (2004)
A Hard Day (2014)

As actor 
The Adventure of Mrs. Park (1996)
Break Out (2002)
Spring Breeze (2003)
Ghost House (2004) cameo
Hellcats (2008)
Manner of Battle (2008)
Attack the Gas Station 2 (2010)
Loveholic Loveholic (2010)
Wonderful Radio (2012) cameo
The Scent (2012) cameo
The Suck Up Project: Mr. XXX-Kisser (2012) cameo
Superstar (2012) cameo
Venus Talk (2014)
Trap (2015)
My New Sassy Girl (2016)

Television series

As director 
Sign (2011)

As screenwriter 
Golden House (2010)
Sign (2011)
The King of Dramas (2012-2013)

As creator 
Who Are You? (tvN, 2013)

As actor 
High Kick Through the Roof (2009)
Sign (2011)
The Greatest Love (2011) cameo
I Need a Fairy (2012)
Phantom (2012)
My Love from the Star (2013) cameo
Potato Star 2013QR3 (2014) cameo
Pinocchio (2014) cameo
 Unlock My Boss (2022) cameo

Variety shows

Web shows

Radio 
  (2018-2019)
 Bae Chul-soo's Music Camp (2022); Special DJ (August 8)

Awards and nominations

References

External links 
 
 
 
 

1969 births
Living people
South Korean film directors
South Korean television directors
South Korean screenwriters
South Korean male film actors
South Korean male television actors
South Korean television writers
Male television writers